Survival in the Sky, known as Black Box in the United Kingdom, is a British documentary series of six one-hour episodes produced by Darlow Smithson Productions for The Learning Channel and Channel 4. The series was narrated by Will Lyman in the United States and Sean Barrett in the United Kingdom. The series primarily concentrated on commercial aviation accidents and the investigations related to them.  They were first aired as a series of only four episodes in late 1996, with two additional episodes produced and aired in 1998.

The series was produced with the cooperation of the National Transportation Safety Board (NTSB) and the Air Accidents Investigation Branch (AAIB), and interviews many of the investigators and survivors of air crashes.

A book also titled Black Box was published in 1996 as a companion to the series.

Episodes

See also
Mayday/Air Crash Investigation

References

External links
 Darlow Smithson Productions

1990s British documentary television series
1996 British television series debuts
1998 British television series endings
1990s American documentary television series
1996 American television series debuts
1998 American television series endings
British drama films
British television docudramas
Channel 4 documentary series
Documentary television series about aviation
English-language television shows
British films based on actual events
TLC (TV network) original programming